George Branković may refer to:

 Đurađ Branković (1377–1456), Serbian prince and despot, reigned 1427–1456
 Đorđe Branković (1461–1516), Serbian titular despot 1486–1496
 Đorđe Branković (count) (1645–1711), Serbian nobleman
 Georgije Branković (1830–1907), Serbian Patriarch of Karlovci
 György Brankovics (opera), an 1874 Hungarian opera by Ferenc Erkel

Brankovic, George